Biathlon at the 2009 European Youth Olympic Winter Festival was held from 17 to 20 February 2009. It was held in Wisla, Poland.

Results

Medal table

Medalists

References 

2009 European Youth Olympic Winter Festival
2009 in biathlon
2009